Sviatlana Usovich (born 14 October 1980) is a Belarusian sprinter who specializes in the 400 metres. Her younger sister, Ilona, is also an athlete.

On 25 November 2016 the IOC disqualified her (and her relay team) from the 2008 Olympic Games and struck her results from the record for failing a drugs test in a re-analysis of his doping sample from 2008.

Competition record

Personal bests
400 metres - 50.79 s (2004)
800 metres - 1:58.11 min (2007)

References

External links
 

1980 births
Living people
Belarusian female sprinters
Athletes (track and field) at the 2004 Summer Olympics
Athletes (track and field) at the 2008 Summer Olympics
Athletes (track and field) at the 2012 Summer Olympics
Olympic athletes of Belarus
European Athletics Championships medalists
Doping cases in athletics
Belarusian sportspeople in doping cases
Universiade medalists in athletics (track and field)
Universiade bronze medalists for Belarus
World Athletics Indoor Championships medalists
Medalists at the 2001 Summer Universiade
Olympic female sprinters